Castello Normanno-Svevo may refer to:
 Castello Normanno-Svevo (Bari)
 Castello Normanno-Svevo (Sannicandro di Bari)

See also 
 Castello Normanno (disambiguation)